The 1990 World Juniors Track Cycling Championships were the 16th annual Junior World Championships for track cycling held in Middlesbrough, United Kingdom in August 1990.

The Championships had five events for men (Sprint, Points race, Individual pursuit, Team pursuit and 1 kilometre time trial) and three for women (Individual pursuit, Points race and Sprint).

Events

Medal table

References

UCI Juniors Track World Championships
1990 in track cycling
1990 in British sport